The Finnish Shooting Sport Federation, Finnish Suomen Ampumaurheiluliitto (SAL), was founded in 1919 and is an umbrella organization for sport shooting in Finland, representing many international shooting sport organizations in Finland. 

SAL is Finlands's representative for the international shooting organizations International Shooting Sport Federation, International Practical Shooting Confederation, World Benchrest Shooting Federation, International Metallic Silhouette Shooting Union, Muzzle Loaders Associations International Committee and the European Shooting Confederation.

Shooting disciplines 
 Pistol (pistooli)
 Rifle (kivääri)
 Shotgun (haulikko)
 Running target (liikkuva maali)
 Practical (practical)
 Metallic silhouette (siluetti)
 Benchrest (kasa-ammunta)
 Black powder (mustaruuti)

National championships 
 The IPSC Finnish Handgun Championship, Rifle Championship, Shotgun Championship, Tournament Championship and Action Air Championship

See also 
 List of shooting sports organizations
 Nordic Shooting Region
 SRA-shooting, a shooting discipline organized by the Finnish Reservist Sports Federation.

Other umbrella organizations for shooting 
 Association of Maltese Arms Collectors and Shooters
 French Shooting Federation
 Hellenic Shooting Federation
 Monaco Shooting Federation
 Norwegian Shooting Association
 Royal Spanish Olympic Shooting Federation
 Swiss Shooting Sport Federation

References

External links 
 Official homepage of the Finnish Shooting Sport Federation

Regions of the International Practical Shooting Confederation
Shooting
National members of the European Shooting Confederation